Wrath  is a 2011 Australian horror film written and directed by Jonathan N Dixon and starring Stef Dawson, Corey Page, William Emmons, Xavier Fernandez, Rebecca Ratcliff, Michael Windeyer, and Charlie Falkner. The film was inspired by revenge films of the 1970s, including The Last House on the Left and I Spit on Your Grave.

Cast 
 Stef Dawson as Leah Thompson                                           
 Corey Page as Matthew Webster
 William Emmons as Erik
 Charlie Falkner as Max Thompson
 Michael Windeyer as William Thompson
 Rebecca Ratcliff as Caroline
 Xabier Fernández as Javier
 Bianca Bradey as Emma
 Jazz Cohn as Amelia
 Rod Ramsay as Edward Thompson

Filming 
Principal photography began in September 2010 in the Northern Rivers, and wrapped in late October 2010.

Release 
The film was well received by international distributors and sales agents but due to the subject matter it received mixed reviews. A worldwide release was planned with Arclight Films in 2011 but at the eleventh hour the deal fell apart after Mark Lindsay president, sales and acquisitions left the company. The film was subsequently released internationally on DVD and Pay TV through Lightning Entertainment in 2011.

References

Australian horror films
2011 horror films
2011 films
2010s English-language films
2010s Australian films